Cape May is a  city located at the southern tip of Cape May Peninsula in Cape May County in the U.S. state of New Jersey. Located where the Delaware Bay meets the Atlantic Ocean, it is one of the country's oldest vacation resort destinations, and part of the Ocean City metropolitan statistical area.

As of the 2020 United States census, the city's year-round population was 2,768, a decrease of 839 (−23.3%) from the 2010 census count of 3,607, which in turn reflected a decline of 427 (−10.6%) from the 4,034 counted in the 2000 census. In the summer, Cape May's population is expanded by as many as 40,000 to 50,000 visitors. The entire city of Cape May is designated the Cape May Historic District, a National Historic Landmark due to its concentration of Victorian architecture.

Cape May was recognized as one of the top 10 beaches in the United States by the Travel Channel. It is part of the South Jersey region of the state.

History

17th and 18th centuries

The area was originally settled by the Kechemeche Native American tribe, who were part of the Lenape tribe. The Kechemeche first encountered European colonialists around 1600. The city was named for the Dutch captain Cornelius Jacobsen Mey, who explored and charted the area between 1611–1614 and established a claim for the province of New Netherland. It was later settled by New Englanders from the New Haven Colony.

Cape May began hosting vacationers from Philadelphia in the mid-18th century and is recognized as the country's oldest seaside resort.

19th century
Following the construction of Congress Hall in 1816, Cape May became increasingly popular in the 19th century and was considered one of the finest resorts in America by the 20th century.

What is now Cape May was formed as the borough of Cape Island by the New Jersey Legislature on March 8, 1848, from portions of Lower Township. It was reincorporated as Cape Island City on March 10, 1851, and was renamed Cape May City on March 9, 1869.

Tourism to the city was boosted in 1963 with the opening of the Tuckahoe and Cape May Railroad.

The city suffered devastating fires in 1869 and 1878. In the early hours of August 31, 1869, a fire broke out in the Japanese store on Washington Street. The fire destroyed the post office and at least thirty-five other buildings.  Press reports at the time did not mention any deaths.  In 1878, a five-day-long fire destroyed 30 blocks of the town center.  Replacement homes were almost uniformly of Victorian style, and more recent protectionist efforts have left Cape May with many famously well-maintained Victorian houses—the second largest collection of such homes in the nation after San Francisco.

20th century
Because of the World War II submarine threat off the East Coast of the United States, especially off the shore of Cape May and at the mouth of the Delaware Bay, numerous United States Navy facilities were located here in order to protect American coastal shipping. Cape May Naval facilities, listed below, provided significant help in reducing the number of ships and crew members lost at sea.

 Naval Air Station, Cape May
 Naval Base, Cape May
 Inshore Patrol, Cape May
 Naval Annex, Inshore Patrol, Cape May
 Joint Operations Office, Naval Base, Cape May
 Welfare and Recreation Office, Cape May
 Dispensary, Naval Air Station, Cape May
 Naval Frontier Base, Cape May
 Degaussing Range (Cold Spring Inlet), Naval Base, Cape May
 Joint Operations Office, Commander Delaware Group, ESF, Cape May
 Anti-Submarine Attack Teacher Training Unit, U.S. Naval Base, Cape May
 Naval Annex, Admiral Hotel, Cape May

In 1976, Cape May was  designated a National Historic Landmark as the Cape May Historic District, making Cape May the only city in the U.S. to be wholly designated as a national historic district. That designation is intended to ensure the architectural preservation of these buildings.

Geography

According to the U.S. Census Bureau, Cape May had a total area of 2.90 square miles (7.50 km2), including 2.47 square miles (6.41 km2) of land and 0.42 square miles (1.10 km2) of water (14.59%).

Unincorporated communities, localities and place names located partially or completely within the city include Poverty Beach.

Cape May borders the Cape May County municipalities of Lower Township and West Cape May Borough, the Atlantic Ocean, and Delaware Bay. The Cape May–Lewes Ferry provides transportation across the Delaware Bay between North Cape May, New Jersey, and Lewes, Delaware.

Cape May Harbor Fest celebrates life in and around the harbor, with the 2011 event commemorating the 100th anniversary of the harbor's creation.

Cape May is the southernmost point in New Jersey. It is at approximately the same latitude as Washington, D.C., and Arlington County, Virginia, and equidistant to Manhattan and Virginia.

Climate
According to the Köppen climate classification system, Cape May, New Jersey has a humid subtropical climate (Cfa) with hot, humid summers, cool winters and year-round precipitation. Its climate resembles that of its neighbor, the Delmarva Peninsula. During the summer months in Cape May, a cooling afternoon sea breeze is present on most days, but episodes of extreme heat and humidity can occur with heat index values ≥ . During the winter months, episodes of extreme cold and wind can occur with wind chill values .

Ecology
According to the A. W. Kuchler U.S. potential natural vegetation types, Cape May, New Jersey would have a dominant vegetation type of Northern Cordgrass (73) with a dominant vegetation form of Coastal Prairie (20).

Demographics

2010 census

The Census Bureau's 2006–2010 American Community Survey showed that (in 2010 inflation-adjusted dollars) median household income was $35,660 (with a margin of error of +/− $4,248) and the median family income was $50,846 (+/− $16,315). Males had a median income of $43,015 (+/− $20,953) versus $31,630 (+/− $22,691) for females. The per capita income for the city was $30,046 (+/− $4,010). About 2.2% of families and 4.8% of the population were below the poverty line, including 5.1% of those under age 18 and 7.1% of those age 65 or over.

2000 census
As of the 2000 United States census, there were 4,034 people, 1,821 households, and 1,034 families residing in the city. The racial makeup of the city was 91.32% White, 5.26% African American, 0.20% Native American, 0.40% Asian, 0.05% Pacific Islander, 1.26% from other races, and 1.51% from two or more races. Hispanic or Latino of any race were 3.79% of the population.

There were 1,821 households, out of which 18.0% had children under the age of 18 living with them, 47.6% were married couples living together, 7.0% had a female householder with no husband present, and 43.2% were non-families. 39.4% of all households were made up of individuals, and 24.2% had someone living alone who was 65 years of age or older. The average household size was 2.02 and the average family size was 2.69.

In the city, the population was spread out, with 16.3% under the age of 18, 11.5% from 18 to 24, 19.8% from 25 to 44, 23.9% from 45 to 64, and 28.5% who were 65 years of age or older. The median age was 47 years. For every 100 females, there were 97.1 males. For every 100 females age 18 and over, there were 94.5 males.

The median income for a household in the city was $33,462, and the median income for a family was $46,250. Males had a median income of $29,194 versus $25,842 for females. The per capita income for the city was $29,902. About 7.7% of families and 9.1% of the population were below the poverty line, including 7.0% of those under age 18 and 10.9% of those age 65 or over.

Economy

Tourism is Cape May's largest industry. The economy runs on the Washington Street Mall and includes shops, restaurants, lodgings, and tourist attractions including the Cape May boardwalk. Many historic hotels and B&Bs are located in Cape May, and commercial and sport fishing is a significant component of its economy.

Cove Beach, located at Cape May southernmost tip, hosts hundreds of swimmers, sunbathers, surfers, and hikers daily during summer months.

Cape May has been a popular resort for French Canadian tourists for several decades. Cape May County established a tourism office in Montreal, Quebec, but around 1995 it closed due to budget cuts. By 2010, the tourism office of Cape May County established a French language coupon booklet.

Arts and culture

Cape May has become known both for its Victorian gingerbread homes and its cultural offerings. The town hosts the Cape May Jazz Festival, the Cape May Music Festival and the Cape May, New Jersey Film Festival. Cape May Stage, an Equity theater founded in 1988, performs at the Robert Shackleton Playhouse on the corner of Bank and Lafayette Streets. East Lynne Theater Company, an Equity professional company specializing in American classics and world premieres, has its mainstage season from June–December and March, with school residencies throughout the year. Cape May is home to the Mid-Atlantic Center for the Arts & Humanities (MAC), established in 1970 by volunteers who succeeded in saving the 1879 Emlen Physick Estate from demolition. MAC offers a wide variety of tours, activities and events throughout the year for residents and visitors and operates three Cape May area historic sites—the 1879 Emlen Physick Estate, the Cape May Lighthouse and the World War II Lookout Tower. The Center for Community Arts (CCA) offers African American history tours of Cape May, arts programs for young people and is transforming the historic Franklin Street School, constructed in 1928 to house African-American students in a segregated school, into a Community Cultural Center.

Cape May is the home of Cape May diamonds, which show up at Sunset Beach and other beaches in the area. These are in fact clear quartz pebbles that wash down from the Delaware River. They begin as prismatic quartz (including the color sub-varieties such as smoky quartz and amethyst) in the quartz veins alongside the Delaware River that get eroded out of the host rock and wash down 200 miles to the shore. Collecting Cape May diamonds is a popular pastime and many tourist shops sell them polished or even as faceted stones.

The Cape May area is also world-famous for the observation of migrating birds, especially in the fall. With over 400 bird species having been recorded in this area by hundreds of local birders, Cape May is arguably the top bird-watching area in the entire Northeastern United States. The Cape May Warbler, a small songbird, takes it name from this location. The Cape May Bird Observatory is based nearby at Cape May Point.

Cape May is also a destination for marine mammal watching. Several species of whales and dolphins can be seen in the waters of the Delaware Bay and Atlantic Ocean, many within  of land, due to the confluence of fresh and saltwater that make for a nutrient rich area for marine life. Whale and dolphin watching cruises are a year-round attraction in Cape May, part of an ecotourism / agritourism industry that generated $450 million in revenue in the county, the most of any in the state.

The Harriet Tubman Museum is in Cape May.

Fisherman's Memorial
Cape May Fisherman's Memorial, located at Baltimore and Missouri Avenues, was built in 1988. It features a circular plaza reminiscent of a giant compass, a granite statue of a mother and two small children looking out to Harbor Cove, and a granite monument listing the names of 75 local fishermen who died at sea. The names begin with Andrew Jeffers, who died in 1893, and include the six people who died in March 2009 with the sinking of the scalloping boat Lady Mary. The granite statue was designed by Heather Baird with Jerry Lynch. The memorial is maintained by the City of Cape May and administered by the Friends of the Cape May Fisherman's Memorial. Visitors often leave a stone or seashell on the statue's base in tribute to the fishermen.

Government

Local government
Effective July 1, 2004, Cape May switched to a Council-Manager form of government under the Faulkner Act, after having used Plan A of the Faulkner Act Small Municipality form since 1995. The city is one of 42 municipalities (of the 564) statewide that use this form of government. The governing body is comprised of the Mayor and the four-member City Council, with all positions elected at-large to four-year terms of office on a non-partisan basis as part of the November general election in even-numbered years. The Mayor is elected directly by the voters. The Borough Council is elected to serve four-year terms on a staggered basis, with three seats coming up for election together and then the mayor and the fourth council seat up for vote together two years later. Following the 2004 elections, the first under the new form of government, lots were drawn to determine which of the newly elected members would serve a four-year term, with the other three serving two-year terms. A city manager is responsible for the city's executive functions, managing Cape May's activities and operation. Voters approved a November 2010 referendum to shift the city's elections from May to November, with city officials estimating that the change would save $30,000 in costs that had been associated with each May election.

In March 2015, Councilman Jerry Inderwies Jr. resigned to protest what he called a "witch hunt" against the police chief. In the November 2015 general election, Roger Furlin was elected to fill the balance of the council seat vacated by Inderwies.

In January 2021, the city council selected Lorraine Baldwin to fill the council seat expiring in 2022 that had been held by Zachary Mullock until he resigned to take office as mayor. Baldwin served on an interim basis until the November 2021 general election, when voters chose her to serve the balance of the term of office. Also in January 2021, Michael Voll was appointed to City Manager.

In November 2021, the city council appointed Michael Yeager to fill the seat expiring in December 2021 that had bene held by Christopher Bezaire until he resigned after pleading guilty earlier that month to charges that he had engaged in stalking an ex-girlfriend and that he had been in contempt of court.

, the Mayor of Cape May City is Zachary Mullock, whose term of office ends December 31, 2024. Other members of the Cape May City Council are Deputy Mayor Lorraine Baldwin (2026), Shaine Meier( (2026), and Michael Yeager (2024; elected to fill an unexpired term) and Maureen McDade(2026).

Federal, state, and county representation

Cape May City is located in the 2nd Congressional District and is part of New Jersey's 1st state legislative district.

Politics
As of March 2011, there were a total of 1,932 registered voters in Cape May City, of which 452 (23.4%) were registered as Democrats, 838 (43.4%) were registered as Republicans and 640 (33.1%) were registered as Unaffiliated. There were 2 voters registered as either Libertarians or Greens.

In the 2012 presidential election, Republican Mitt Romney received 52.2% of the vote (745 cast), ahead of Democrat Barack Obama with 46.9% (669 votes), and other candidates with 0.9% (13 votes), among the 1,442 ballots cast by the city's 1,925 registered voters (15 ballots were spoiled), for a turnout of 74.9%. In the 2008 presidential election, Republican John McCain received 50.9% of the vote (817 cast), ahead of Democrat Barack Obama, who received 46.4% (745 votes), with 1,605 ballots cast among the city's 1,940 registered voters, for a turnout of 82.7%. In the 2004 presidential election, Republican George W. Bush received 53.8% of the vote (942 ballots cast), outpolling Democrat John Kerry, who received around 44.0% (771 votes), with 1,752 ballots cast among the city's 2,276 registered voters, for a turnout percentage of 77.0.

In the 2013 gubernatorial election, Republican Chris Christie received 72.9% of the vote (737 cast), ahead of Democrat Barbara Buono with 25.8% (261 votes), and other candidates with 1.3% (13 votes), among the 1,036 ballots cast by the city's 1,902 registered voters (25 ballots were spoiled), for a turnout of 54.5%. In the 2009 gubernatorial election, Republican Chris Christie received 52.1% of the vote (608 ballots cast), ahead of both Democrat Jon Corzine with 39.1% (457 votes) and Independent Chris Daggett with 6.8% (80 votes), with 1,168 ballots cast among the city's 2,069 registered voters, yielding a 56.5% turnout.

Infrastructure
Cape May established a desalinization plant in the late 1990s to manage salt going into its water aquifers.

Cape May's current sewage plant in 1960 or 1961, less than a year after the New Jersey Attorney General's deadline for Cape May Point to have a sewage plant, as it had previously dumped sewage in the Delaware Bay; the New Jersey Department of Health had warned the borough about this in 1951. Despite the borough missing the deadline, the state never fined the borough as the Attorney General removed his judgment.

Education

For pre-kindergarten through sixth grade, public school students attend Cape May City Elementary School as part of the Cape May City School District. As of the 2021–22 school year, the district, comprised of one school, had an enrollment of 169 students and 22.6 classroom teachers (on an FTE basis), for a student–teacher ratio of 7.5:1. Also attending are students from Cape May Point, a non-operating district, as part of a sending/receiving relationship, with most students in the district coming from the United States Coast Guard Training Center Cape May.

For seventh through twelfth grades, public school students attend the schools of the Lower Cape May Regional School District, which serves students from Cape May City, Cape May Point, Lower Township and West Cape May. Schools in the district (with 2021–22 enrollment data from the National Center for Education Statistics) are
Richard M. Teitelman Middle School with 439 students in grades 7-8 and
Lower Cape May Regional High School (LCMRHS) with 764 students in grades 9–12. In the 2011–12 school year, the city of Cape May paid $6 million in property taxes to cover the district's 120 high school students, an average of $50,000 per student attending the Lower Cape May district. Cape May officials have argued that the district's funding formula based on assessed property values unfairly penalizes Cape May, which has higher property values and a smaller number of high school students as a percentage of the population than the other constituent districts, especially Lower Township. The high school district's board of education has nine members, who are elected directly by voters to serve three-year terms of office on a staggered basis, with three seats up for election each year Seats on the board are allocated based on population, with Cape May City assigned one seat.

Students are also eligible to attend Cape May County Technical High School in Cape May Court House, which serves students from the entire county in its comprehensive and vocational programs, which are offered without charge to students who are county residents. Special needs students may be referred to Cape May County Special Services School District in the Cape May Court House area.

The nearest private Catholic school serving Cape May is Wildwood Catholic Academy (Pre-K12) in North Wildwood, under the auspices of the Roman Catholic Diocese of Camden.

Colleges and universities in the Cape May area include Atlantic Cape Community College, Rutgers University–Camden, and the Institute of Marine and Coastal Sciences.

The Cape May Branch of the Cape May County Public Library is located in Cape May City. The library was previously in city hall but later moved to a standalone building. In 2009 an estimated $507,800 renovation was to take place with $395,300, or about 78% of the expenses, paid by Cape May County.

History of education

The first Cape May High School, built in 1901, was designed by Seymour Davis and built for $35,000. In 1917 a new Cape May High School facility was built, with the 1901 building becoming an elementary school. In the past Cape May elementary schools were segregated on the basis of race, with black elementary school students attending Franklin Street School. Cape May High School educated students of all races. Cape May High closed effective December 22, 1960, and LCMRHS opened in 1961. the first Cape May High School building was demolished, and an Acme Markets location occupies where it was. The second Cape May High School building has since become the city hall and police station.

Cape May previously had its own Catholic K–8 school, Our Lady Star of the Sea School, which served as the parish school for Our Lady Star of the Sea, St. John of God (North Cape May) and St. Raymond (Villas) churches. The St. Raymond School closed in 2007 with students sent to Our Lady Star of the Sea. In 2010 Our Lady Star of the Sea merged into Cape Trinity Regional School (Pre-K–8) in North Wildwood. That school in turn merged into Wildwood Catholic Academy in 2020.

Starting in 2010, discussions were under way regarding a possible consolidation of the districts of Cape May City, Cape May Point and the West Cape May School District.

Transportation

Roads and highways

Route 109 leads into Cape May from the north and provides access to the southern terminus of the Garden State Parkway along with U.S. Route 9 in neighboring Lower Township. U.S. Route 9 leads to the Cape May–Lewes Ferry, which heads across the Delaware Bay to Lewes, Delaware.

Public transportation

NJ Transit provides service to Philadelphia on the 313 and 315 routes and to Atlantic City on the 552 route, with seasonal service to Philadelphia on the 316 route and to the Port Authority Bus Terminal in Midtown Manhattan on the 319 route.

The Great American Trolley Company operates trolley service in Cape May daily during the summer months, running along a loop route through the city.

The city is served by rail from the Cape May City Rail Terminal, offering excursion train service on the Cape May Seashore Lines from the terminal located at the intersection of Lafayette Street and Elmira Street.

The city last had regional passenger train service by the Pennsylvania-Reading Seashore Lines in the mid-1960s. Final service into Camden, New Jersey (across the Delaware River from Philadelphia) ended in January 1966, while service to Lindenwold station ended in October 1981.

Ferry transport
The Delaware River and Bay Authority operates the Cape May-Lewes Ferry year-round, a 70-85 minute across Delaware Bay to Lewes, Delaware, carrying passengers and cars. The ferry constitutes a portion of U.S. Route 9.

The Delaware River and Bay Authority operates a shuttle bus in the summer months which connects the Cape May Welcome Center with the Cape May–Lewes Ferry terminal.

Media

Cape May is served by several media outlets including WCFA-LP 101.5 FM, a commercial-free jazz and community station, the weekly Cape May Star and Wave, two free weekly newspapers, The Cape May Gazette and Exit Zero, and local websites CapeMay.com and Cape May Times.

The countywide newspaper is Cape May County Herald.

The regional newspapers for the area including Cape May County are the Press of Atlantic City, and the Philadelphia Inquirer.

The name Exit Zero refers to the town's location at the far southern end of the Garden State Parkway near the intersection with Route 109. Informally, the entire town is sometimes called Exit Zero.

Coast Guard Training Center Cape May

The United States Coast Guard Training Center Cape May, New Jersey is the nation's only Coast Guard Recruit Training Center. In 1924, the U.S. Coast Guard occupied the base and established air facilities for planes used in support of United States Customs Service efforts. During the Prohibition era, several cutters were assigned to Cape May to foil rumrunners operating off the New Jersey coast. After Prohibition, the Coast Guard all but abandoned Cape May leaving a small air/sea rescue contingent. For a short period of time (1929–1934), part of the base was used as a civilian airport. With the advent of World War II, a larger airstrip was constructed and the United States Navy returned to train aircraft carrier pilots. The over the water approach simulated carrier landings at sea. The Coast Guard also increased its Cape May forces for coastal patrol, anti-submarine warfare, air/sea rescue and buoy service. In 1946, the Navy relinquished the base to the Coast Guard. The Cape May Airport still houses the Naval Air Station Wildwood Aviation Museum.

In 1948, all entry level training on the U.S. East Coast was moved to the U.S. Coast Guard Recruit Receiving Station in Cape May. The U.S. Coast Guard consolidated all recruit training functions in Cape May in 1982. Over 350 military and civilian personnel and their dependents are attached to the Cape May Training Center.

In popular culture
 Cape May is the subject of the song "On the Way to Cape May",  originally sung by Cozy Morley.
 The 1980s horror film The Prowler was filmed entirely on location in Cape May.
 The town lends its name to the Cape May Cafe, a restaurant in the Beach Club Resort at Walt Disney World.
 In The Blacklist, Cape May is the setting in the episode "Cape May".

Notable people

People who were born in, residents of, or otherwise closely associated with Cape May include:

 Douglas Adams (1876–1931), cricketer, who played for the Gentlemen of Philadelphia in First class cricket
 Cliff Anderson (1929–1979), football player who played two seasons in the NFL with the Chicago Cardinals and New York Giants
 Nan Brooks (1935–2018), children's book illustrator
 Thomas Cannuli, professional poker player, known for finishing 6th place in the 2015 WSOP Main Event and winning a WSOP bracelet in the $3,333 WSOP.com ONLINE No-Limit Hold'em High Roller
 Frederick B. Dent (1922–2019), politician who served as the United States Secretary of Commerce from 1973 to 1975
 Eugene Grace (1876–1960), president of Bethlehem Steel Corporation from 1916 to 1945
 Bubba Green (born 1957), football player who played defensive lineman for one season for the Baltimore Colts
 T. Millet Hand (1902–1956), politician who represented New Jersey's 2nd congressional district in the United States House of Representatives and served as mayor of Cape May
 Thomas H. Hughes (1769–1839), the founder and owner of the Congress Hall Hotel, and a Democratic-Republican member of the United States House of Representatives from New Jersey
 Chris Jay (born 1978), musician, actor and screenwriter. Founding member of the band, Army of Freshmen
 Alan Kotok (1941–2006), computer scientist known for his work at Digital Equipment Corporation and at the World Wide Web Consortium
 John D. Lankenau (1817–1901), German-American businessman and philanthropist
 Jarena Lee (1783–1864), the first woman authorized to preach by Richard Allen, founder of the African Methodist Episcopal Church, in 1819
 Anthony Maher (born 1979), professional soccer forward
 Myles Martel (born 1943), communication adviser
 Sylvius Moore (1912–2004), football player and coach who was head coach of the Hampton Pirates football team
 Richie Phillips (1940–2013), sports union leader
 Bill Pilczuk (born 1971), competitive swimmer
 Louis Purnell (1920–2001), curator at the National Air and Space Museum and earlier in life, a decorated Tuskegee Airman
 Emil Salvini (born 1949), author, historian and host / creator of PBS's Tales of the Jersey Shore
 Charles W. Sandman Jr. (1921–1985), politician who represented New Jersey's 2nd congressional district and was the party's candidate for Governor of New Jersey in 1973
 I. Grant Scott (1897–1964), politician who served in the New Jersey General Assembly, the New Jersey Senate and as Mayor of Cape May
 Barbara Lee Smith (born 1938), mixed media artist, writer, educator and curator
 Witmer Stone (1866–1939), ornithologist who did much of his research in Cape May
 Julius H. Taylor (1914–2011), professor emeritus at Morgan State University who was chairperson of the department of physics.
 Paul Volcker (1927–2019), former chairman of the United States Federal Reserve who was born here while his father was the City Manager
 John B. Walthour (1904–1952), 4th bishop of the Episcopal Diocese of Atlanta

See also

 Cape May Light

References

Further reading

External links

 Cape May City official website
 Cape May New Jersey Information, Directions and History

Cape May
1848 establishments in New Jersey
Cities in Cape May County, New Jersey
Faulkner Act (council–manager)
Jersey Shore communities in Cape May County
Populated places established in 1848
Articles containing video clips
Port cities and towns in New Jersey